Eric Richard Whitington (born 18 September 1946) is an English former professional footballer who scored 8 goals from 32 appearances in the Football League for Brighton & Hove Albion. He played as a forward. He also played in the South African National Football League for the 1968 title-winning Highlands Park team.

Life and career
Whitington was born in Brighton. His football career began as a schoolboy with Arsenal, after which he joined Chelsea's ground staff. While with Chelsea he played for England at youth international level. He signed for Brighton & Hove Albion in 1964, turned professional the same year, and made his debut for the Third Division club in February 1966. In the 1966–67 season, he was the club's joint top scorer, alongside Kit Napier, with ten goals in all competitions, but a perceived lack of pace stopped him establishing himself as a first-team regular. He was released in 1968, and moved to South Africa to play for Highlands Park, who won the National Football League title in 1968. After returning to England, he played for Crawley Town of the Southern League, Folkestone, Eastbourne United, and for Isthmian League club Horsham, where he was the club's top scorer in the 1975–76 season with 25 goals in 42 League games, before finishing his career back at Crawley.

Whitington's son Craig also played in the Football League.

References

External links
 Highlands Park F.C. 1968 team photo

1946 births
Living people
Footballers from Brighton
English footballers
Association football forwards
England youth international footballers
Chelsea F.C. players
Brighton & Hove Albion F.C. players
Highlands Park F.C. players
Crawley Town F.C. players
Folkestone F.C. players
Eastbourne United F.C. players
Horsham F.C. players
English Football League players
National Football League (South Africa) players
Southern Football League players
Isthmian League players